The 1968–69 Minnesota North Stars season was the North Stars' second season.

Coached by Wren Blair (12–20–9) and John Muckler (6–23–6), the team compiled a record of 18–43–15 for 51 points, to finish the regular season 6th in the West Division, and failed to qualify for the playoffs.

Offseason

Regular season

Final standings

Record vs. opponents

Schedule and results

Playoffs
With a sixth-place finish in the West Division, the North Stars did not make the playoffs in their second season.

Player statistics

Awards and records

Transactions

Draft picks
Minnesota's draft picks at the 1968 NHL Amateur Draft held at the Queen Elizabeth Hotel in Montreal, Quebec.

Farm teams

See also
1968–69 NHL season

References

External links
 

Minnesota
Minnesota
Minnesota North Stars seasons
Minnesota North Stars
Minnesota North Stars